Meekatharra Airport  is an airport in Meekatharra, Western Australia.

Historic context

The airport was utilised in the 1930s in early stages of flight into the North West and Pilbara regions of Western Australia.

Airlines and destinations

See also
 List of airports in Western Australia
 Aviation transport in Australia

References

External links
 Airservices Aerodromes & Procedure Charts

Airports in Western Australia
Mid West (Western Australia)